The Sangrai dance is a traditional Indian dance performed by the Mog tribal community on the occasion of Sangrai festival during the month of Chaitra (in April) of the Bengali calendar year. It originated in Tripura, India.
Mogs are Buddhist and have the close affinity with Burmese Buddhism. On 26 January 2018, on India's Republic day, Rajpath witnessed for the first time a traditional dance of the Mog tribe of Tripura, the land of plentiful myths and legends

For the first time, 150 tribal students selected from 25 schools of three districts of Tripura will perform the traditional ‘Sangrai dance’ in the ceremonious Republic Day parade.

Sangrai dance is performed by the Mog tribal community on the occasion of Sangrai festival during the month of Chaitra (in April) of the Bengali calendar year. The Mogs are one of the 19 tribes in Tripura.

References 

Dances of Tripura